George Herbert McCracken (June 20, 1899 – March 11, 1995) was an American football player and coach. McCracken played football as a running back at the University of Pittsburgh from 1918 to 1920 under coach "Pop" Warner and was a member of Pittsburgh's 1918 national championship team.

He served as the head  coach at Allegheny College from 1921 to 1923 and at Lafayette College from 1924 to 1935, compiling a career college football record of 75–48–7.  His 1926 Lafayette Leopards team was recognized as a national champion by Parke H. Davis. That same year his former coach's Pop Warner's Stanford Indians were recognized as the national champions by a different publication.

He was inducted into the College Football Hall of Fame as a coach in 1973. Some, including Pop Warner, consider him to be the first to regularly implement the offensive team huddle, beginning its use in Lafayette in 1924 to hide his instructions from the opposing team.

During his coaching days, McCracken was the cofounder of the very successful Scholastic Inc publishing concern, which he was associated with for 63 years. He was also a brother of the Delta Tau Delta fraternity while he was a student at the University of Pittsburgh.

Head coaching record

References

External links
 

1899 births
1995 deaths
American football halfbacks
Allegheny Gators football coaches
Lafayette Leopards football coaches
Pittsburgh Panthers football players
College Football Hall of Fame inductees
Sportspeople from Pittsburgh
Coaches of American football from Pennsylvania
Players of American football from Pittsburgh